Adrienne Lecouvreur is a French tragic play written by Ernest Legouvé and Eugène Scribe. It portrays the life of the leading French actress of the eighteenth century Adrienne Lecouvreur and her mysterious death.  It was produced April 14, 1849.

Adaptations
In 1902 the play was used as the basis for the libretto of the opera Adriana Lecouvreur by Francesco Cilea and Arturo Colautti. It was also the basis of the operetta Adrienne with music by Walter W. Goetze, produced in Hamburg in 1926.  There have been a number of film versions of the play including Dream of Love (1928) an American film starring Joan Crawford and Adrienne Lecouvreur (1938) a Franco-German co-production directed by Marcel L'Herbier and starring Yvonne Printemps.

Films
, directed by Henri Desfontaines and Louis Mercanton (France, 1913, short), starring Sarah Bernhardt
Adriana Lecouvreur, directed by Ugo Falena (Italy, 1919), starring 
The Faces of Love, directed by Carmine Gallone (Italy, 1924), starring Soava Gallone
Dream of Love, directed by Fred Niblo (1928), starring Joan Crawford
Adrienne Lecouvreur, directed by Marcel L'Herbier (France, 1938), starring Yvonne Printemps
Adriana Lecouvreur, directed by Guido Salvini (Italy, 1955), starring Valentina Cortese

References

Bibliography
 Forman, Edward. Historical dictionary of French theater. Scarecrow Press, 2010.

External links
 

Plays by Eugène Scribe
1849 plays
French plays adapted into films
Plays set in France
Plays set in the 18th century
Biographical plays about actors
Cultural depictions of Adrienne Lecouvreur